Earl Poleski is an American political figure who served as a member of the Michigan House of Representatives from a district covering Jackson, Michigan and surrounding areas. He has a bachelor's degree from Albion College and a master's degree from Walsh College.

Poleski worked for several years as a CPA. He was first elected to the state house in 2010. Poleski was appointed to the position of Executive Director of the Michigan State Housing Development Authority (MSHDA) on February 22, 2017 by Governor Rick Snyder. On March 28, 2019, he was removed from his position as Executive Director of MHSDA, by vote of its board of directors.

Electoral history

Sources
State House bio of Poleski

References

Living people
Republican Party members of the Michigan House of Representatives
Albion College alumni
American accountants
Walsh College alumni
Year of birth missing (living people)
21st-century American politicians